M1 is the oldest line of the Bucharest Metro, the first section having been opened on 16 November 1979. The M1 Line runs from Dristor 2 to Pantelimon. Between Nicolae Grigorescu and Eroilor it shares  of tracks with the M3. Due to the single track between Republica and Pantelimon, which has only one operational platform, most trains terminate at Republica and about one in three reaches at Pantelimon.

History 
Construction of the line began in 1975, three years after the Bucharest Metro Committee was formed. The chosen route would run along the Dâmbovița river, from Timpuri Noi to Semănătoarea (today Petrache Poenaru), with the depot based at Ciurel. The ends of the line were factories, because the initial objective of the system was to transport people to the factories where they worked.

A few extensions followed, namely the branch line from Eroilor to Industriilor (today Preciziei) in 1983, from Semănătoarea to Crângași in 1984 and then to Gara de Nord in 1987. In 1989 the section between Gara de Nord and Dristor 2 was opened, however at the time this was considered the M3, thus completing the Crângași-Dristor branch. It was also initially supposed to reach the Pantelimon housing estate, but these plans were abandoned. This section was later integrated into the M1 and the Eroilor - Industriilor section became the M3.

The newest part of the line is from Republica to Pantelimon, also known as Antilopa station, opened in 1990. As stated above, due to the size of Pantelimon station only roughly one in three trains terminate there, the rest terminating at Republica. Thus, although part of line M1, some Bucharest city tourist maps show this short section in a different colour from the rest of the line (usually black).

Rolling stock 
The M1 line uses Bombardier Movia trains. These were employed firstly on the M2 in 2000s, until a second batch was introduced on the M1. The line also used to operate Astra IVA trains from its inception until the 2010s when Metrorex started to phase out the old trains.

Name changes

References

Bucharest Metro Lines
Railway lines opened in 1979
1979 establishments in Romania